Natham is a village in the Tiruvallur district of Tamil Nadu, India. It is located in the Gummidipoondi taluk. Sri Jayaram Institute of Engineering and Technology is located near this village.

Demographics 

According to the 2011 census of India, Natham has 626 households. The effective literacy rate (i.e. the literacy rate of population excluding children aged 6 and below) is 65.17%.

References 

Villages in Gummidipoondi taluk